The German torpedo boat T29 was one of fifteen Type 39 torpedo boats built for the Kriegsmarine (German Navy) during World War II. Completed in mid-1943, the boat was transferred to France in January 1944. She fought in the Action of 26 April off the coast of Brittany, and was sunk by four Allied destroyers with the loss of 137 crewmen.

Design and description
The Type 39 torpedo boat was conceived as a general-purpose design, much larger than preceding German torpedo boats. Their crew numbered 206 officers and sailors. The Type 39s were fitted with a pair of geared steam turbine sets, each driving one propeller, using steam from four high-pressure water-tube boilers.

As built, the Type 39 ships mounted four  SK C/32 guns in single mounts protected by gun shields; one forward of the superstructure, one between the funnels, and two aft, one superfiring over the other. Anti-aircraft defense was provided by four  SK C/30 AA guns in two twin-gun mounts on platforms abaft the rear funnel, six  C/38 guns in one quadruple mount on the aft superstructure and a pair of single mounts on the bridge wings. They carried six above-water  torpedo tubes in two triple mounts amidships and could also carry 30 mines; the full complement of 60 mines made the ships top-heavy which could be dangerous in bad weather. For anti-submarine work the boats were fitted with a S-Gerät sonar and four depth charge launchers. The Type 39s were equipped with a FuMO 21 radar and various FumB radar detectors were installed late in the war.

Construction and career
Originally ordered as a Type 37 torpedo boat on 30 March 1939, T29 was reordered on 10 November 1939 from Schichau. She was laid down at their Elbing, East Prussia, shipyard as yard number 1488, and commissioned on 21 August 1943. After working up, T29 and her sister  arrived in Western France during late January 1944. En route the two torpedo boats were shelled by British coastal artillery and attacked by a pair of British Fairey Albacore torpedo bombers that caused some minor damage to T28.

Action of 26 April 1944

They detected the Allied ships shortly afterwards and reversed course. T24 had fruitlessly fired her aft torpedo tubes at her pursuers and was then hit by two shells in her superstructure that started fires that were quickly doused. She fired her remaining torpedoes to no effect at 02:54 and, about that same time, a shell disabled T29s rudder. Ashanti and Huron concentrated on T29, initially hitting her stern which caused her to veer off-course, while Haida and Athabaskan continued their pursuit of T24.

Ashanti and Huron hit their target repeatedly at close range; these hits set T29 on fire, caused an explosion and blew the forward torpedo mount overboard. Haida and Athabaskan were unable to catch T24 and returned to help sink T29, but were initially unable to do so despite firing 15 torpedoes. The destroyers paused to allow the surviving crew to abandon ship around 04:00. When they moved in to recover survivors, a single 2 cm gun opened fire and damaged Huron and Haida. A patrol boat later rescued 73 men.

Notes

Citations

References

Further reading

External links
 T29 at german navy.de

Type 39 torpedo boats
Ships built by Schichau
Ships built in Elbing
Maritime incidents in April 1944